Damini Bhir is a Nepali novel written by Rajan Mukarung which won the Madan Puraskar in 2069 BS. The novel depicts the circumstances, psychology and practices of Nepali society during transitional phase in unique and very practical manner.

References

Nepali-language books
Nepalese novels
Madan Puraskar-winning works
21st-century Nepalese novels

Nepalese books
Nepali-language novels
2012 Nepalese novels
Novels set in Nepal